
Gmina Trzebownisko is a rural gmina (administrative district) in Rzeszów County, Subcarpathian Voivodeship, in south-eastern Poland.

Villages
Gmina Trzebownisko contains the villages and settlements of Jasionka, Łąka, Łukawiec, Nowa Wieś, Stobierna, Tajęcina, Terliczka, Trzebownisko, Wólka Podleśna and Zaczernie.

Neighbouring gminas
Gmina Trzebownisko is bordered by the city of Rzeszów and by the gminas of Czarna, Głogów Małopolski, Krasne and Sokołów Małopolski.

References
Polish official population figures 2006

Trzebownisko
Rzeszów County